Veeramani may refer to:

 K. Veeramani (born 1933), President of the Dravidar Kazhagam, an Indian organisation centred in Tamil Nadu
 Veeramanidasan, South Indian Hindu devotional singer in Tamil, Telugu and Kannada languages
 Veeramani (film), a 1994 Tamil action film
 K. Veeramani (1936-1990), Devotional Singer